is a series of jidaigeki novels written by Tomoyoshi Murayama originally serialized in the Sunday edition of the newspaper Akahata from November 1960 to May 1962.  Shinobi no mono is the long form of the phrase meaning ninja, see the Ninja article for details.

Novels
Set during Japan's Sengoku period, the novels depicted Goemon Ishikawa, a famous outlaw hero who was boiled alive at the end of the 16th century by order of Hideyoshi Toyotomi, as a ninja who fought against samurai warlords.

Films
Between 1962 and 1966, a series of eight Shinobi no Mono films (aka Ninja, a Band of Assassins, aka Ninja Spy) starring Raizo Ichikawa were produced and released by the Daiei Motion Picture Company. The first three films are based on the novel, while the five subsequent films are based on four original screenplays by Hajime Takaiwa (also the screenwriter on the first three films) and one original screenplay by Kinya Naoi.

* Following the death of series lead Raizo Ichikawa in 1969, Daiei attempted to revive/continue the series with a 9th film entitled 忍びの衆 Shinobi no Shū (Ninja Spies) starring Hiroki Matsukata, who also replaced Ichikawa in their other popular series Nemuri Kyoshiro.

Television series
The novels were also adapted into a 52-episode television series starring Ryuji Shinagawa and co-produced by the Toei Company and television network NET (now known as TV Asahi) and broadcast from July 24, 1964 to July 30, 1965.  Only the first episode remains in existence.

References

External links
Shinobi no Mono, Zoku Shinobi no Mono, Shin Shinobi no Mono, Shinobi no Mono: Kirigakure Saizo, Shinobi no Mono: Iga-yashiki, Shinobi no Mono: Shin Kirigakure Saizo] and [https://www.imdb.com/title/tt0201924/ Shinsho: Shinobi no Mono at the Internet Movie Database
Shinobi no mono - Oni no Hana Productions
Shinobi no Mono - Vintage Ninja

1962 films
1962 novels
1964 Japanese television series debuts
1965 Japanese television series endings
Japanese black-and-white films
Films based on Japanese novels
Japanese film series
20th-century Japanese novels
1960s Japanese-language films
Jidaigeki television series
Jidaigeki films
Ninja films
Sengoku period in fiction
Television shows based on Japanese novels
Novels first published in serial form
Works originally published in Japanese newspapers
1960s Japanese films